Anacardium humile, a plant species from the genus Anacardium and the family Anacardiaceae, is known for its medicinal and insecticidal properties. The shrub is commonly found in the Brazilian Pantanal and Cerrado. Common names inclue monkey nut, dwarf cashew nut, cajui, cajuzinho-do-cerrado, and caju-do-campo.

References

External links

humile
Endemic flora of Brazil
Flora of the Cerrado